Josef Engel (1816 in Vienna – 1899) was an Austrian anatomist.

He was appointed professor of anatomy at Zürich in 1844 and later he became professor of physiology also. Five years afterward, he was appointed professor of pathological anatomy at the University of Prague. In 1854 he became professor of anatomy at the Josephsakademie (Josephinum), Vienna, in which position he remained until 1874. He made many important contributions to the systematization of anatomical science and its study.

Works
His principal works are Lehrbuch der pathologischen Anatomie (“Textbook of pathological anatomy”), and Kompendium der topographischen Anatomie (“Compendium of topographical anatomy,” 1859).

Notes

References

1816 births
1899 deaths
Austrian physiologists
Austrian anatomists
Academic staff of Charles University
Academic staff of the University of Zurich